Tukarak Island is an uninhabited island in Qikiqtaaluk Region, Nunavut, Canada. Located in Hudson Bay, it is a member of the Belcher Islands group. Along with Flaherty Island, Innetalling Island, and Kugong Island, it is one of the four large islands in the group.

It is dotted with several lakes, one of which is also called Tukarak. Flaherty Island faces it across Omarolluk Sound all along its western side. It is bounded by Fairweather Sound on its south side. Other islands in the immediate vicinity include Bradbury Island, Dove Island, Karlay Island, and Nero Island.

References

External links 
 Tukarak Island in the Atlas of Canada - Toporama; Natural Resources Canada

Belcher Islands
Islands of Hudson Bay
Uninhabited islands of Qikiqtaaluk Region